Ervin László founded international organization the Club of Budapest in 1993 to expand beyond the scientific purpose of the General Evolution Research Group to try to mobilize the resources of humanity to meet future challenges.

The Club of Budapest is an informal association of people in art, literature and culture.

It has branches in Austria, Brazil, Canada, China, France, Germany, Hungary, India, Italy, Japan, Mexico, the Netherlands, Samoa, Switzerland, Turkey, the United States and Venezuela. Fiona Douglas-Scott-Montagu, baroness Montagu of Beaulieu, was its first global ambassador.

Creative members

References

External links
 Club of Budapest Official website
 Club of Budapest Basque French website

1993 establishments in Hungary
Think tanks established in 1993
Think tanks based in Hungary
Political and economic think tanks based in Europe
Systems thinking
Futures studies organizations
Globalism